The Northeast 82nd Avenue station is a light rail station on the MAX Blue, Green and Red Lines in Portland, Oregon. It is the 13th stop eastbound on the eastside MAX.  It serves the neighborhoods of Rose City Park, Roseway, Madison South, Montavilla and Mount Tabor.

The station is at the intersection of Northeast 82nd Avenue and Interstate 84. This station is connected to 82nd Avenue by a stairway and one elevator.  Access to the station is from the east side of the 82nd Avenue overpass.

The station was located in TriMet fare zone 2 from its opening in 1986 until September 2012, at which time TriMet discontinued all use of zones in its fare structure.

Bus line connections
This station is served by the following bus lines:
72 - Killingsworth/82nd Ave
77 - Broadway/Halsey

References

External links
Station information (with westbound ID number) from TriMet
Station information (with eastbound ID number) from TriMet
MAX Light Rail Stations – more general TriMet page

MAX Light Rail stations
MAX Blue Line
MAX Red Line
MAX Green Line
Railway stations in the United States opened in 1986
1986 establishments in Oregon
Madison South, Portland, Oregon
Railway stations in Portland, Oregon